Fatal Fury: King of Fighters, known as  in Japan, is a 1991 head-to-head fighting game released by SNK for the Neo Geo arcade and home platforms. Fatal Fury was SNK's first fighting game for the Neo Geo system and served as the inaugural game in their Fatal Fury series, as well as the first game to depict the fictional "King of Fighters" tournament, which became the basis for the later The King of Fighters games.

The game was designed by former Capcom employee Takashi Nishiyama, the creator of the original Street Fighter (1987). Many of SNK's mainstay characters, including the Bogard brothers Terry and Andy, friend Joe Higashi, and their nemesis Geese Howard, made their debut in this game.

Gameplay

The gameplay follows the typical formula of most fighting games: the player competes against their opponent in best two-out-of-three matches. The play controls consist of an eight directional joystick and three attack buttons: punch, kick and throw. Each of the playable characters has special techniques that are performed by inputting specific commands in combination with the joystick and buttons. The input methods for special moves are shown to the player during the course of the game (after every bonus round), as opposed to being given in an instruction card in the game's cabinet.

The most novel aspect of Fatal Fury was the addition of two-lane battles. Many stages featured two rows, a background row, and a foreground row. Players can change between rows at any time other than in the Single Player Mode, where they have to wait for the CPU opponent to change rows before they can in almost every stage. The player is not required, however, to do so. When a second player joins during the middle of a one-player fight, instead of postponing the current battle for a match between the two players, the game will make both players team up against the current CPU opponent in a two-on-one match before their battle takes place. After every other match in the single-player tournament, the player will participate in a bonus round mini-game involving an arm wrestling match against a machine. The player must tap the A button rapidly to win these mini-games.

Development
The game was designed by Takashi Nishiyama, the creator of the original Street Fighter (1987) at Capcom. After leaving Capcom for SNK, Nishiyama wanted to create a fighting game with a storyline and characters that were easier to empathize with, something he wasn’t able to achieve with Street Fighter. Fatal Fury, which Nishiyama envisioned as a spiritual successor to Street Fighter, was developed around the same time as Street Fighter II (1991). While Street Fighter II placed more emphasis on combos, Fatal Fury placed more emphasis on the timing of special moves as well as storytelling, which are two features that he failed on during the original Street Fighter.

Plot
In 1981, Terry and his younger brother Andy were orphans who raised themselves on the streets. They were soon adopted by Jeff Bogard, a master martial artist, eventually living in Southtown. When Terry was 10, they both witnessed the brutal murder of their adoptive father at the hands of Geese Howard. Knowing that they needed more training to confront Geese, the brothers made an oath to spend a decade to fine tune their martial arts before trying to avenge their father. Andy decided to perfect his own martial art over at Japan to differentiate himself from his older brother by being taught the Shiranui-ryū Ninjutsu (Shiranui Style Ninja Technique) and a form of empty-handed combat called Koppōken. Terry faithfully chose to wander in his home country, combining the Hakkyokuseiken fighting skills learned from his father, his father's mentor Tung Fu Rue who is the shih-fu of both the art of Hakkyokuseiken and the art of Bajiquan, and Terry also studied other martial arts abilities gained from the street fighters of South Town.

A decade later into the present, the crime lord Geese Howard organized a tournament, dubbed "The King of Fighters". Andy returns to South Town to reunite with Terry. After the Bogard brothers pay respects to Jeff's grave, they encounter and befriend the Japanese Muay Thai champion, Joe Higashi, from Thailand and learn about the K.O.F. tournament hosted by Geese. Andy enters with the two in an attempt to avenge their father, but lost the tournament to Geese's right-hand man Billy Kane before he could reach Geese, Joe Higashi also lost to Geese's muscle-bound henchman Raiden after getting passed by his bitter rival Hwa Jai. Terry then defeated all 7 fighters including his former mentor, Tung Fu Rue, and celebrated his victory, when suddenly Terry gets captured by two henchmen and sent to Geese's Tower by force, to have a one-on-one showdown with the crime boss himself. Geese was a formidable opponent for Terry, but he gained the upper hand by defeating him with a jump kick out of his tower, causing Geese to plummet to his death. As Terry left the tournament victorious, Andy felt a mixed sense of closure and returned to Japan to continue his training.

Characters
At the beginning of the game, the player is given the option to select one fighter which is either Terry, Andy, or Joe. The player is then given the next option to select from one of four fighters as their first opponent: Duck King, Richard Meyer, Michael Max, and Tung Fu Rue. After defeating their first opponent, the player faces the other three opponents in the following order: Richard, Michael, Duck, Tung. The cycle begins at whichever opponent the player has selected. The three bosses before the final boss Geese Howard are fought in the following order: Hwa Jai, Raiden and Billy Kane.

Competitors 
 Terry Bogard - an American martial arts expert seeking to avenge his father's death.
 Andy Bogard - Terry's younger brother, who learned Koppōjutsu in Japan.
 Joe Higashi - a Japanese Muay Thai master and a friend to the Bogard brothers.

Challengers
 Duck King - a street dancing talent who uses a "rhythmical" fighting style.
 Richard Meyer - a capoeira master with numerous kick techniques.
 Michael Max - a Catholic boxer who has a projectile attack called the Tornado Upper (similar to Joe's Hurricane Upper). He is based on Mike Tyson.
 Tung Fu Rue - a Bajiquan master who is elderly and meek. Taking enough damage results in him focusing his inner energy in order to transform into a musclebound version of himself, complete with a discus clothesline called the Senpuu Gouken (旋風剛拳; lit. "Whirlwind Strong Fist") and a projectile-emitting kick called the Shou Ha Senpuu Kyaku (衝波旋風脚; lit. "Power Wave Whirlwind Kick").

Bosses
 Hwa Jai - a Muay Thai master from Thailand who gains his strength from drinking an unknown liquor. His special technique is a flying knee kick called the Dragon Kick (มังกรเตะ, Mạngkr Tea), similar to Joe's Tiger Kick.
 Raiden - a professional heel  known for his ruthlessness in the ring. He is very strong and is known to manhandle his opponents. He moved to South Town to get involved with strong fights. He was hired by Geese Howard as one of his henchmen. He has a special technique called Vapor Breath.
 Billy Kane - a Bōjutsu master who serves as the tournament's undefeated champion. His signature move involves him throwing his staff in front of his opponent, then cowers in a defensive position until Geese's bodyguard Ripper tosses Kane a spare.

Final boss
 Geese Howard - the final boss of the game. An underworld crime boss and the sponsor of the "King of Fighters" tournament. After defeating Billy, the player's character is kidnapped by Geese's men and taken to his building, Geese Tower, for the game's final battle. His fighting style is aikido and has a projectile attack similar to Terry's Power Wave called the Reppuken (烈風拳 / れっぷうけん; lit. "Gale Fist"). He can also slam his opponent after blocking a close-range attack, this technique is called the Atemi Nage (当身投 / あて身なげ; lit. "Hit Throw"). When the player loses to Geese, instead of the standard continue screen, they witness their character falling off from Geese Tower. However, if the player wins, their character will knock off Geese from his building, seemingly killing him.

Console versions
 The Super NES version of Fatal Fury, published by Takara and developed by Nova, was published in Japan in 1992 and in North America during the following year. This version discards the two-lane system in favor of a more conventional one-lane plane. The two-on-one battles are gone and the arm wrestling bonus rounds are replaced by new bonus rounds involving the main character punching flying tires. In the game's Versus Mode, all of the CPU-controlled characters are playable, albeit only on the second player's side. Players can also pick the same main character (in an alternate color).
 The Mega Drive/Genesis version was released in 1993, published by Sega in Japan and by Takara in North America. This version removes the characters of Hwa Jai and Billy Kane from the roster, relegating them to background cameos. Instead, the player faces against the other two main characters during the course of the single-player mode. This version allows both players to play as the CPU-controlled characters in the game's Versus Mode (with Geese Howard available via a cheat code).
 An X68000 version produced by Mahou Kabushikigaisha (Magical Company) was released in Japan only on May 21, 1993.
 An emulation of the original Neo Geo game is included along with its sequels Fatal Fury 2, Fatal Fury Special and Fatal Fury 3, in the compilation Fatal Fury: Battle Archives Vol. 1 for the PlayStation 2. This version includes an option for the original arcade soundtrack or an arranged soundtrack composed specifically for the compilation.
 The Neo Geo version of Fatal Fury has been released by D4 Enterprise as part of the Virtual Console downloadable lineup for the Wii. Later it became available on the Nintendo Switch's eShop.
 The original Fatal Fury is also included in SNK Arcade Classics Vol. 1, released for the PlayStation 2, PlayStation Portable, and Wii.
 The Neo Geo version was available on PlayStation Network as part of SNK's Neo Geo Station lineup.

Reception

Commercial
In Japan, Game Machine listed Fatal Fury: King of Fighters on their January 1, 1992 issue as being the third most-successful table arcade unit of the month. It went on to be Japan's fourth highest-grossing arcade game of 1992, below Street Fighter II (two versions) and Captain Commando. In North America, RePlay reported Fatal Fury to be the second most-popular arcade game in February 1992.

Critical
Paul Rand of Computer and Video Games called Fatal Fury one of the best Neo Geo games available in 1992 and compared it favorably with Street Fighter II, stating Fatal Fury was a "brilliant feast of fighting" with "huge and excellently drawn" character sprites, great animation, and unique special attacks "giving the game more variety."

In a retrospective review, Maximum commented in 1996 that the game failed to offer any real competition for Street Fighter II in either playability or character selection. They concluded, "The only main point in this game's favor is that two of the characters may team together to take on a computer opponent in a three-player frenzy, and the game also tries to offer something else new with a two-tier playing arena, but the slow action and the disgracefully difficult fireball motions make special moves something of a rare occurrence." In 2018, Complex rated the game 74th on their "The Best Super Nintendo Games of All Time". They praised the combat and the ability to jump in and out of the backgrounds concluding: "One of the best fighters on the SNES, by far."

References

External links 
 Fatal Fury: King of Fighters at GameFAQs
 Fatal Fury: King of Fighters at Giant Bomb
 Fatal Fury: King of Fighters at the Killer List of Videogames
 Fatal Fury: King of Fighters at MobyGames

1991 video games
ACA Neo Geo games
Arcade video games
Cooperative video games
D4 Enterprise games
Fatal Fury
Fighting games
Magical Company games
Multiplayer and single-player video games
Neo Geo games
Neo Geo CD games
Nintendo Switch games
PlayStation Network games
PlayStation 4 games
Sega Genesis games
X68000 games
Super Nintendo Entertainment System games
SNK games
SNK Playmore games
Tag team videogames
Virtual Console games
Video games developed in Japan
Xbox One games
Hamster Corporation games